The Academia della Farnesina, also known as the Accademia fascista maschile di educazione fisica or Accademia fascista della Farnesina, was a centre for sport and political education in Fascist Italy.

The Fascist School of Physical Education 
The Fascist School of Physical Education opened on 5 February 1928 and was initially hosted in the Farnesina, in the Military Academy of Physical Education. The institute had an essential aim: to train the Physical Education teachers of the Italian schools and the sport instructors of the Opera Nazionale Balilla (ONB). However, the lack of youth leaders obliged Renato Ricci, president of the ONB, to partially change the aims of the institute. As a consequence, the school became the most important centre for training the male leadership of the Fascist youth organizations.

The ONB 
Study at the Farnesina lasted two years. After students obtained their certificate, they attended a nine-month apprenticeship. After that, they were permanently hired by the Opera Nazionale Balilla. During the course of study, students played many sports and gymnastic activities and attended various classes; for example, anatomy, physiology, first aid, traumatology, hygiene, psychology, Fascist law, philosophy, pedagogy, history of physical education, art, singing, French, and English. 

One year after its inauguration, the school changed its name to "Accademia fascista di educazione fisica" ("Fascist academy of physical education"). Ricci wanted it to be "the biggest educational experiment" ever tried in order to create the new man. The institute had to guarantee to the Opera Nazionale Balilla the educators and leaders it needed.
From 1929 onwards, being a member of the National Fascist Party became a prerequisite to applying for a position at the school. The applicants were chosen partially by taking into consideration years spent in Fascist organizations. The syllabi at the school were also changed starting in 1929; all the subjects, considered necessary in order to train from a political point of view the future leaders of the youth organizations, became treated as essential. Alumni of the school were assigned different roles according to their capacity shown during the course, some of them becoming teachers in the school, and others (the most suitable ones from a political point of view) became youth leaders.

The Institute moved to its final seat at "Palazzo H" of the Foro Mussolini in November 1932.

Two laws stated clearly the foundation of the organization and the aims of the Foro Mussolini Institute: the Royal Decree 1.227 of 28 August 1931 and the Royal Decree 1.592 of 31 August 1933. According to such legislative measures the school had to be a centre to train and select the Fascist Youth leadership.

The GIL 
In 1937, the Fascist youth organization became a party organization and changed its name from Opera Nazionale Balilla to Gioventù Italiana del Littorio (GIL). Consequently, the school also had to be reorganized. In April 1938, the General Command of the GIL appointed two commissions. Their aim was to draft new statutes and new syllabi for the Fascist Academies of Rome and Orvieto. Following the lines drawn by the two commissions, the Italian Parliament promulgated a new law, No. 866 of 22 May 1939, which ordered both institutes to operate until the end of the Fascist regime. The Foro Mussolini Institute changed its name to "Accademia della GIL". The Academy depended on the Fascist Party directly rather than, as before, on the Ministry of National Education. It became an educational centre closely tied to the Party. The courses were now extended to three years, and studying the German language became compulsory in 1940. The subjects were divided into four sections: political, military, biological-scientific, and sport. Unlike all other Italian institutes, the degrees of the Academy were awarded not in the name of the King, but in the name of the Duce.

To become a student at the Academy, it was necessary to pass a public selection and to demonstrate to be deserving from a moral, political, racial, personal and family point of view. The applications were not sent by young people themselves, but by the local commands of the Youth organization. These selected the applicants they found most suitable to attend the school. After 1938 racial purity became an essential requirement and Jewish students were expelled.

On 30 October 1940 Riccardo Versari, who had been chancellor of the school since its foundation, left his seat to Nicola Pende, father of the Italian Somatotype and constitutional psychology and one of the scientists who wrote down the Manifesto of Race. He tried in vain to transform the schools in Rome and Orvieto into universities.

Post-regime 
After the end of the Fascist regime on 25 July 1943, the GIL was dissolved and the schools were closed. In the Repubblica Sociale Italiana (RSI), Renato Ricci created a new youth organization known as Opera Balilla. He also founded once again the male and female academies respectively in Gallarate and in Castiglione Olona. When the war ended, many students, who couldn't finish the courses at the Fascist academies, asked to complete their training and to get the final degree. As a consequence, Parliament approved in 1950 law number 415. It stated that it was necessary to organize some courses so that the former students, who had to stop attending the academies, could pass the final exams. This law gave the possibility to many students, first of all those expelled for racial reasons, to finish their courses. The law stated also that the courses organized in the RSI and the degrees granted by the academies of Gallarate and Castiglione Olona were not to be acknowledged by the Italian democratic state. On 20 February 1951 the High Council of Public Education approved the regulation for the organization of the courses that took place in Rome from 1951 to 1954. To guarantee the training of the physical education teachers of the Italian democratic republic it was opened in Rome the Istituto Superiore di Educazione Fisica (ISEF) (or High Institute for Physical Education) in 1953. Only on 25 January 1967, the Institute obtained a final seat at the former GIL Music Academy located at the Foro Italico (former Foro Mussolini).

Notes

Bibliography 
Discorso del Rettore Senatore Prof. Dott. Riccardo Versari all’inaugurazione dell’IX anno accademico dell’Accademia della GIL al Foro Mussolini il 6 novembre XVIII, Roma, 1940.
Accademia della GIL, Roma, s.d.
Accademia fascista, febbraio 1935, Roma.
Accademie e collegi dell’Opera Balilla, Roma, Anno XV [1937].
L’Accademia della GIL-Visita al Foro Mussolini-Corso per «Visitatrici fasciste», Roma, 1940.
AA.VV., Accademiste a Orvieto. Donne ed educazione fisica nell’Italia fascista 1932-1943, Documenti e saggi, a cura di Motti L. e Rossi Caponeri M., Perugia, 1996.
C. Betti, L’Opera nazionale balilla e l’educazione fascista, La Nuova Italia, Firenze, 1984
A. Cammarata, La scuola del fascismo. Appunti di pedagogia militante per gli educatori, Palermo, 1938.
A. Cammarata, Pedagogia di Mussolini. La scuola dell’Opera Nazionale Balilla. I corsi per i capi centuria e i Campi DUX, Palermo, 1932.
M. Caporilli e F. Simeoni, Il Foro Italico e lo Stadio olimpico: immagini dalla storia, Tomo edizioni, Roma, 1990.
V. Cian, Su l’Opera Nazionale Balilla, discorso pronunciato nella seduta del 4 aprile 1933-XI, Roma, 1933.
Comitato dei monumenti moderni, Il Foro Italico, Clear, Roma, 1990.
M. Di Donato, L’evoluzione storica della formazione del personale insegnante di educazione fisica in Italia (1847-1943), in «Alcmeone», nn. 5-6, 1985, pp. 175–179.
A. Greco e S. Santuccio, Foro Italico, Multigrafica, Roma, 1991.
Tracy H. Koon, Believe Obey Fight: Political Socialization of Youth in Fascist Italy, 1922-1943, University of North Carolina press, Chapel Hill, 1985
R. Marzolo, L’Opera Balilla, Roma, anno XV [1937].
T.B. Morgan, Italian physical culture demonstration, NY, 1932.
G.A. Oddo, Due anni da allievo dell’Accademia Fascista X-XI, Cantù, 1935.
A. Pica, Il Foro Mussolini, 1937, Bompiani, Milano.
D.S. Piccoli, Le organizzazioni giovanili in Italia, Roma, 1936.
PNF-GIL, Accademie, collegi e scuole. Bando di concorso anno XVIII-XIX, Roma, 1940.
PNF, Gioventù del Littorio, Accademie, Collegi e scuole, Bando di concorso anno XVIII–XIX, Roma, anno XVIII.
A. Ponzio, A Forgotten Story: The Training for the Teachers of Physical Education in Italy during the Fascist Period, in «Sport in Society», 1, 2008, pp. 44–58.
A. Ponzio, L’Accademia della Farnesina: un esperimento di pedagogia totalitaria nell’Italia fascista (1927-1943), in «Mondo contemporaneo», 1, 2008, pp. 35–66.
A. Ponzio, Die Führerschaftsausbildung in der Hitlerjugend und in den italienischen Jugendorganisationen, in «Quellen und Forschungen aus italienischen Archiven und Bibliotheken», 1, 2009, pp. 489–511.
A. Ponzio, La formazione degli insegnanti di educazione fisica nel ventennio fascista, in «Lancillotto e Nausicaa», November 2009, pp. 36–47.
A. Ponzio, La Palestra del Littorio. L’Accademia della Farnesina: un esperimento di pedagogia totalitaria nell’Italia fascista,  Milano, Franco Angeli, 2009.
A. Ponzio, Shaping the New Man. Youth Training Regimes in Fascist Italy and Nazi Germany,  Madison, University of Wisconsin Press, 2015.
E. Raspa, Educazione Balillistica, Catania, 1937.
A. Sacchetto, L’Opera Nazionale Balilla, Padova, 1936.
F. Varese, L’Accademia femminile di educazione fisica di Orvieto, in «Alcmeone», n. 1, 1992, pp. 34–39.
N. Zapponi, Il partito della gioventù. Le organizzazioni giovanili del fascismo 1926-1943, in «Storia contemporanea», luglio-ottobre, 1982, pp. 569–633

See also 
Foro Mussolini viltual tour 
Gioventù Italiana del Littorio
Opera Nazionale Balilla
Foro Italico

Education in Italy
Sport in Italy